R. B. S. Varma is a leader of Bharatiya Janata Party from Uttar Pradesh. He was member of Rajya Sabha from 1994 to 2006. He also served as a member of Uttar Pradesh Legislative Assembly from 1977 to 1980 and 1990 to 1992. He completed MSC in chemistry and Ph.D. and served as professor.

References

1946 births
People from Kannauj district
Varma R B S
Uttar Pradesh academics
Living people
Bharatiya Janata Party politicians from Uttar Pradesh